Calisto archebates is a butterfly of the family Nymphalidae. It is endemic to Hispaniola, where it is found in the southern paleoisland's Sierra de Bahoruco.

The larvae feed on Isachne rigifolia.

References

Butterflies described in 1832
Calisto (butterfly)